Edenilson Bergonsi (born 13 September 1987), sometimes known as just Edenilson, is a Brazilian professional footballer who plays as a midfielder for Gibraltar National League side Bruno's Magpies. He also holds Italian nationality.

Club career

Brazil
Edenilson Bergonsi started his professional career at Mogi Mirim of Campeonato Paulista Série A2 before returned to native Rio Grande do Sul state in March 2007. He played for Esportivo in 2007 Campeonato Brasileiro Série C and moved to Cerâmica on 26 September 2008, which finished as the runner-up of 2008 Copa FGF. He also trailed for Legnano at the start of 2008–09 season.

In December 2008, he was signed by Brasil de Pelotas in 1-year contract. He left for Juventude after the end of 2009 Campeonato Gaúcho. He only played 3 times in 2009 Campeonato Brasileiro Série B, and 8 times in 2010 Campeonato Gaúcho.

Europe

Varese
In July 2010, Edenilson Bergonsi joined Italian club Varese, but failed to make a single appearance in the Serie B. He only played 4 games in the reserve league as an overage player.

Brussels
In January 2011, Edenilson Bergonsi left for Belgian Second Division side FC Brussels along with teammate Café. He made his debut for Brussels in their match against Rupel Boom on 4 February, coming on as a second-half substitute for Sébastien Siani. He scored his first two goals in a 3–2 win against Waasland-Beveren at Edmond Machtens Stadium on 19 March. Edenilson ended the season with 11 appearances.

Bulgaria
On 30 July 2012, Edenilson Bergonsi signed with Bulgarian A Professional Football Group club Cherno More on a three-year deal. In June 2014, Bergonsi joined CSKA Sofia on a one-year contract. In February 2015, he sustained a meniscus injury that kept him out of action until the end of the season. On 1 July he again became ready for play. Following the 2015/16 season, Edenilson's contract with Pirin Blagoevgrad was not renewed.

Drita
On 8 November 2016, Edenilson Bergonsi signed with Football Superleague of Kosovo club Drita.

CD Eldense
On 18 January 2017, Edenilson Bergonsi signed with club CD Eldense.

Enosis Neon Paralimni
On 1 July 2017, Edenilson Bergonsi signed with club Enosis Neon Paralimni.

Boa Esporte FC

On 5 January 2019 sign to Boa Esporte Brazil team, he played Campeonato Mineiro and win Campeonato do Interior Mineiro.

Atletico Termo Fiuggi

On 15 July 2019 Edenilson Bergonsi come back
To Italy, in Atletico Termo Fiuggi.

FK Panevezys
On 10 January 2020, Edenilson Bergonsi signed with Lithuanian A Lyga club FK Panevėžys. During 2020 season he played 16 matches and scored one goal in the league. With the club he won 2020 Lithuanian Football Cup.

Bruno's Magpies
In November 2021. after a stint with Esporte Clube São Luiz back in Brazil, he moved to Gibraltar to join Bruno's Magpies. He scored on his debut, against Lions Gibraltar in a 3–2 win on 20 November 2021.

References

External links

1987 births
Living people
Brazilian footballers
Brazilian people of Italian descent
Mogi Mirim Esporte Clube players
Cerâmica Atlético Clube players
Grêmio Esportivo Brasil players
Esporte Clube Juventude players
S.S.D. Varese Calcio players
R.W.D.M. Brussels F.C. players
PFC Cherno More Varna players
PFC CSKA Sofia players
OFC Pirin Blagoevgrad players
CD Eldense footballers
Enosis Neon Paralimni FC players
FC Drita players
Boa Esporte Clube players
First Professional Football League (Bulgaria) players
Cypriot Second Division players
Association football midfielders
Brazilian expatriate footballers
Brazilian expatriate sportspeople in Italy
Brazilian expatriate sportspeople in Belgium
Brazilian expatriate sportspeople in Bulgaria
Expatriate footballers in Italy
Expatriate footballers in Belgium
Expatriate footballers in Bulgaria
Expatriate footballers in Cyprus
Expatriate footballers in Kosovo
Sportspeople from Rio Grande do Sul
F.C. Bruno's Magpies players
Brazilian expatriate sportspeople in Gibraltar
Brazilian expatriate sportspeople in Kosovo
Brazilian expatriate sportspeople in Cyprus